Summit Lake is a lake in the Lassen Volcanic National Park of 
Shasta County, California, east of California Route 89 at elevation . Two campgrounds, named Summit Lake North and Summit Lake South, are located adjacent to the lake.

See also
 List of lakes in California

References

External links
 

Lassen Volcanic National Park
Lakes of Shasta County, California
Lakes of California
Lakes of Northern California